Automolis pallida is a moth of the family Erebidae. It was described by George Hampson in 1901. It is found in the Democratic Republic of the Congo, Eritrea, Ethiopia, Ghana, Kenya, Rwanda and South Africa.

References

Syntomini
Moths described in 1901
Erebid moths of Africa